Talatampara is a panchayat in Kanchili mandal of Srikakulam District in Andhra Pradesh, India. It is located in between the small towns Sompeta and Kaviti.

Demographics
 Indian census, the demographic details of Tatatampara village is as follows:
 Total Population: 	4,193 in 914 Households
 Male Population: 	2,060 and Female Population: 	2,133
 Children Under 6-years of age: 565 (Boys - 287 and Girls -	278)
 Total Literates: 	2,470

References

Villages in Srikakulam district